Fire, Burn! is a historical mystery novel by John Dickson Carr. It is about a police officer who is transported back in time to 1829 when the British police was first formed. Carr considered this one of his best impossible crime novels.

Awards
1969 – Grand Prix de Littérature Policière – best foreign novel, tied with The Daughter of Time by Josephine Tey

Adaptations
1971 – Morte a passo di valzer – Italian TV mini-series

References

Novels by John Dickson Carr
1957 American novels
Fiction set in 1829
Historical mystery novels
Novels set in the 1820s
Novels set in London
Novels about time travel
Locked-room mysteries
Harper & Brothers books
American novels adapted into television shows